The Pesnica is a river in Styria, southeastern Austria and in Styria, northeastern Slovenia.

Its source is near Glanz an der Weinstraße, near the Austrian-Slovenian border. It passes Zgornja Kungota, Pesnica, Pernica, the castle at Hrastovec v Slovenskih Goricah, Lenart v Slovenskih Goricah, the monastery of Sveta Trojica v Slovenskih Goricah, Dornava, and Velika Nedelja, and then merges with the Drava near Ormož, on the border with Croatia.

References

External links

 Condition of Pesnica - graphs, in the following order, of water level, flow and temperature data for the past 30 days (taken in Ranca by ARSO)

Rivers of Styria
Rivers of Styria (Slovenia)
Rivers of Austria
International rivers of Europe